2C-E is a psychedelic phenethylamine of the 2C family. It was first synthesized by Alexander Shulgin and documented in his book PiHKAL. Like the other substances in its family, it produces sensory and cognitive effects in its physical reactions with living organisms.

Properties

2,5-Dimethoxy-4-ethylphenethylamine is a colorless oil.  Crystalline forms are obtained as the amine salt by reacting the free base with a mineral acid, typically hydrochloric acid (HCl).

Shulgin does not report an exact boiling point for the free base, stating only that during one synthesis the fraction boiling between 90 and 100 °C at 0.25 mmHg pressure was collected and converted to the hydrochloride salt. Shulgin reports the melting point of the hydrochloride salt as 208.5–210.5 °C.

Effects

According to Shulgin, the duration of 2C-E's effects is generally between six and ten hours for an average dose, with the plateau lasting between three and six hours.

2C-E's effects are often described as "neutral", in comparison with other psychedelic chemicals and even other 2C-x related molecules. In PiHKAL, Shulgin states:
"Here is another of the magical half-dozen. The range is purposefully broad. At 10 milligrams there have been some pretty rich +++ experiences, and yet I have had the report from one young lady of a 30 milligram trial that was very frightening. My first experience with 2C-E was really profound, and it is the substance of a chapter within the story. Several people have said, about 2C-E, "I don't think I like it, since it isn't that much fun. But I intend to explore it again." There is something here that will reward the experimenter. Someday, the full character of 2C-E will be understood, but for the moment, let it rest as being a difficult and worth-while material. A very much worth-while material."

Adverse effects
Adverse effects include tachycardia, hypertension,  agitation, delirium, and hallucinations.  At least two deaths have been attributed to a 2C-E overdose.

Drug prohibition laws

Australia
In Queensland, 2C-E was added to the 'Dangerous Drugs' list of the 'Drugs Misuse Act 1986' by the 'Drugs Misuse Amendment Act 2008'.  Making it illegal to produce, supply or possess.

Canada
As of October 31, 2016, 2C-E is a controlled substance (Schedule III) in Canada.

China
As of October 2015, 2C-E is a controlled substance in China.

Denmark
2C-E is added to the list of Schedule B controlled substances.

Germany
2C-E is an Anlage I controlled drug.

New Zealand
New Zealand has a catch-all Analogues section in Schedule 3 / Class C of their drug laws that would make 2C-I, 2C-E, DOI, ephedrine, and pseudoephedrine Schedule 3 compounds in New Zealand.

Portugal 
Portugal has decriminalized possession of all recreational drugs in quantities no more than a ten-day supply of that substance. However production and distribution (buying/selling) are a criminal offense.

Sweden
Sveriges riksdags health ministry  classified 2C-E as "health hazard" under the act  (translated Act on the Prohibition of Certain Goods Dangerous to Health) as of Oct 1, 2004,  in their regulation SFS 2004:696 listed as 2,5-dimetoxi-4-etylfenetylamin (2C-E), making it illegal to sell or possess.

UK
In the United Kingdom, 2C-E is a Class A controlled substance. The UK has the strictest laws in the EU on designer drugs. The Misuse Of Drugs Act was amended in 2002 to include a "catch most" clause outlawing every drug, and possible future drug, from the LSD (ergoline) and MDMA (phenethylamine) chemical families (including 2C-E). The amendment is a near verbatim quote from the books of the American biochemist Alexander Shulgin, who obtained a PhD from the University of California, Berkeley. Dr. Shulgin, a former research chemist at the Dow Chemical Company, re-discovered the synthesis for MDMA in 1976 and published the syntheses for more than 200 phenethylamine compounds of his own invention, and 55 tryptamine compounds many of which were also his own invention. The Shulgins were motivated to release the synthesis information as a way to protect the public's access to information about psychedelic compounds, a goal Alexander Shulgin has noted many times.

United States
As of July 9, 2012, in the United States 2C-E is a Schedule I substance under the Food and Drug Administration Safety and Innovation Act of 2012, making possession, distribution and manufacture illegal.

Notes

References

External links
 Project WebTryp, includes description of UK laws regarding Phenethylamines
 Erowid 2C–E vault
 Chapter in Myron J. Stolaroff's Thanatos To Eros, 35 Years of Psychedelic Exploration discussing author's experiments with 2C-E

2C (psychedelics)
Designer drugs
O-methylated phenols